The Georgetown Project is an upcoming American horror thriller film written and directed by M. A. Fortin and Joshua John Miller. It stars Russell Crowe, Ryan Simpkins, Chloe Bailey, Sam Worthington, David Hyde Pierce, and Samantha Mathis.

Cast
 Russell Crowe as Anthony Miller
 Sam Worthington as Joe
 Ryan Simpkins as Lee Miller
 Chloe Bailey as Blake Holloway
 David Hyde Pierce as Father Conor
 Marcenae Lynette as Monica
 Tracey Bonner as Regina
 Samantha Mathis as Jennifer Simon
 Adrian Pasdar as Tom
 Adam Goldberg as Peter

Production
In October 2019, it was announced Russell Crowe had joined the cast of the film, with M. A. Fortin and Joshua John Miller directing from a screenplay they wrote. Miramax will produce the film. In November 2019, Ryan Simpkins, Chloe Bailey, Sam Worthington, David Hyde Pierce, Tracey Bonner, Samantha Mathis, Adrian Pasdar and Adam Goldberg joined the cast of the film.

Principal photography began in Wilmington, North Carolina in November 2019 and wrapped in December.

References

External links
 

Upcoming films
American horror thriller films
Films produced by Bill Block
Films shot in North Carolina
Miramax films